Kamalpur may refer to:

India

Assam
 Kamalpur, Assam, a town in Kamrup district, Assam
 Kamalpur, Assam Assembly constituency, legislative constituency in Assam

Gujarat
 Kamalpur, Gujarat, a town and former princely state in Kathiawar Agency, Gujarat
 Kamalpur, Surendranagar, a village in Dasada tehsil of Surendranagar district

Punjab
 Kamalpur, Bhulath, a village in Bhulath Tehsil in Kapurthala district
 Kamalpur, Sultanpur Lodhi, a village in Sultanpur Lodhi in Kapurthala district
 Kamalpur, Jalandhar, a village in Shankot tehsil in Jalandhar district
 Kamalpur, Rupnagar, a village in Chamkaur Sahib tehsil in Rupnagar district

Tripura
 Kamalpur, Tripura, a town and a nagar panchayat in Dhalai district, Tripura
 Kamalpur, Tripura Assembly constituency, the state assembly constituency centered around the town
 Kamalpur Airport in the above town

Uttar Pradesh
 Kamalpur, Uttar Pradesh, in Mungra Badshahpur, Jaunpur district
 Kamalpur, Khiron, a village in Raebareli district
 Kamalpur, Rohaniya, a village in Raebareli district
 Kamalpur Baraila, a village in Raebareli district

West Bengal
 Garh Kamalpur, Purba Medinipur district

Elsewhere 
 Kamalpur, Nepal
 Kamalpur, Pakistan
 Kamalpur, in Baksiganj Upazila, Jamalpur District, Bangladesh
 Battle of Kamalpur, 1971
 Kamalpur, in Moulvibazar Sadar Upazila, Bangladesh

See also 
 Boria Kamalpur, a village in Rewari mandal of Jatusana Block, Haryana, India
 Kamalapur (disambiguation)
 Kamalpur Musa, a Pathan village in Hazro Tehsil, Attock District, Punjab, Pakistan
 Mohanpur Kamalpur, a village development committee in Siraha District in the Sagarmatha Zone of south-eastern Nepal
 Khowai-Ompi-Kamalpur Baptist Association (KOK), main baptist association of Khowai and Ompi subdivisions of West Tripura and Dhalai districts of Tripura